Taveta is a town in the Taita-Taveta County, Kenya.

Location
Taveta town is wedged into a projection of Kenyan territory bordered on the north and west by Tanzania.

The town lies at the border with Tanzania, directly across from the town of Holili. The coordinates of the town are:3°23'44.0"S, 37°40'34.0"E (Latitude:-3.395565; Longitude:37.676113). In addition to Mount Kilimanjaro, Taveta also enjoys proximity to Lake Chala, a volcanic freshwater lake of extraordinary depth.

First World War 
In 1914, Taveta was the scene of the first military action in East Africa between forces of the British and German empires.  On 15 August, a German force of about 300 soldiers, led by Captain Tom von Prince, advanced across the border and seized the town of Taveta.  The objective was both to strengthen the defence of German East Africa and to provide a base for attacks into British territory, especially on the Uganda Railway.

Corporal Murimu Mwiti, leading the small group of police that were defending Tavita, stood his ground and was killed by the advancing German forces.  A German officer, Friedrich Broeker, was also shot before the British force retreated.  Taveta remained in German hands until it was recaptured by the British in March 1916.

Overview 
Taveta thrives as a point of commerce between Kenya and Tanzania, with a twice-weekly outdoor market especially large for a town of its size.  The market is fueled in part by Taveta's rail connection through Voi with the Mombasa-Nairobi-Kampala line, built during the era of British Kenya.  Large numbers of people walk across the border from Tanzania to buy and sell wares in Taveta; smuggled goods such as Tanzanian rubies and coffee are occasionally available there.

Taveta Town is a fast-growing town. The Town Council of Taveta has acquired a  former sisal plantation for town expansion. The Holili/Taveta customs and immigration post is a One Stop Border Post.

The current (2014) Member of Parliament for Taveta Constituency, which is largely the district and by extension the town, is Dr. Naomi Shaaban. She is a third term Member of Parliament.

At one time, Taveta has had several Members of Parliament from different tribes, namely Mwacharo Kubo a taita, Norman Lukindo a kamba, Jackson Mwalulu a kamba, Alex Dingiria, Othinel Mnene, Naomi Shaaban, all Tavetas, and even a Kenyan of Greek origin, Basil Criticos.

Population
, the urban center had a population of 22,018. The main ethnicities in Taveta are the Taveta and Kamba tribes.

See also 

 Railway stations in Kenya
 Railway stations in Tanzania

References

External links 
 Webpage of Taveta Town Council

Populated places in Kenya
Populated places in Taita-Taveta County
Kenya–Tanzania border crossings